Pohjanmaa is a Finnish word meaning "lowlands", and may refer to:

Former entities
 Pohjanmaa, former name of Ostrobothnia (historical province), comprising a large western and northern part of modern Finland, belonging to Sweden until 1809
 Pohjanmaan lääni or Ostrobothnia County, a county of the Swedish Empire from 1634 to 1775

Current entities
 Pohjois-Pohjanmaan maakunta or Northern Ostrobothnia, a region in Finland
 Etelä-Pohjanmaan maakunta or Southern Ostrobothnia, a region of Finland that includes the city of Seinäjoki
 Pohjanmaan maakunta or Ostrobothnia (region), a region in western Finland
 Keski-Pohjanmaan maakunta or Central Ostrobothnia, a region of Finland

Naval ships
 Pojanmaa or Pojama, a type of warship built for the Swedish archipelago fleet in the late 18th and early 19th centuries
 Pohjanmaa, a former minelayer and flagship of the Finnish Navy
 Pohjanmaa-class corvette, an upcoming surface combatant class of the Finnish Navy

Other
 "Po-Jama People", a song by Frank Zappa on his album One Size Fits All

See also
Ostrobothnia (disambiguation)